Gerold Blümle (born 1937) is a German economist.

Blümle was born on 30 January 1937 in Lörrach and, from 1972 to 2002, was the Professor of Mathematical Economics at the University of Freiburg and a leading German exponent of the theory  of income distribution and external trade theory. He is the brother of the very well known  Ernst-Bernd Blümle. In his research, he combines economic history and theory history. He argues that political economics as such should serve life; theoretical and historical thinking should be linked. During his studies, which he spent in Freiburg im Breisgau and in Freiburg im Üechtland, among other places, he joined the Catholic Student Associations, K.St.V. Germania-Hohentwiel and K.St.V. Carolingia-Friborg, in the Kartellverband.

Gerold Blümle developed a business cycle model as a predator-prey relationship. In this model, there is a cyclical relationship between the investment ratio and the spread or variance of the profits, which is represented by Lotka-Volterra equations. <ref> Gerold Blümle: "Wachstum und Konjunktur bei Differenzgewinnen – Ein Schumpeter-Modell der wirtschaftlichen Entwicklung" in : Beiträge zur angewandten Wirtschaftsforschung. ed. by HJ Ramser and Hajo Riese. Gottfried Bombach zum 70. Geburtstag. Berlin, 1989, pp. 13–37. Also in Frank Schohl: Die markttheoretische Erklärung der Konjunktur. Schriften zur angewandten Wirtschaftsforschung. Tübingen, 1999.</ref>

From 1985 to 1990 he was a member of the Advisory Board of the Friedrich Naumann Foundation for Freedom. 

For many years, Blümle has also researched, lectured, taught and written on the subject of Baden's national game of Cego.Das badische Nationalspiel Cego at swv-schopfheim.de.  Retrieved 30 May 2020.

 Works 
 Theorie der Einkommensverteilung. 1975.
 Fortschritt und Schöpfungsglaube oder Die Machbarkeit des Glücks. 1984.
 Wirtschaftsgeschichte und ökonomisches Denken, Ausgewählte Aufsätze. 2008.
 Das badische Nationalspiel Cego'', 2018.

References

Weblinks 
 Article in the Süddeutschen Zeitung dated 30 March 2005
 

Academic staff of the University of Freiburg
20th-century German economists
Free Democratic Party (Germany)
1937 births
German Roman Catholics
Card game personalities
Living people